Jacques Gabriel (1934–1988) was a Haitian painter. A Port-au-Prince native, Gabriel studied at The New School for Social Research in New York City and received a scholarship to study in Paris, France. His works have been exhibited in the United States, Italy, Jamaica, and at the Museum of Modern Art in Paris.

References
 

1934 births
1988 deaths
20th-century Haitian painters
20th-century male artists
Haitian male painters